Xavier Niel (born 25 August 1967) is a French billionaire businessman involved in the telecommunications and technology industry. He is best known as founder and majority shareholder of the French Internet service provider and mobile operator Iliad trading under the Free brand (France's second-largest ISP, and third mobile operator). He is also co-owner of the newspaper Le Monde, co-owner of the rights of the song "My Way" and owner of Monaco Telecom, Salt Mobile SA and Eir. He is chairman and chief strategy officer for Iliad, but also a board member of KKR and Unibail-Rodamco-Westfield.

As of August 2021, his net worth is estimated at US$10.5 billion.

Early life and education
Xavier Niel was born into a middle class family; his father is a lawyer for a pharmaceutical laboratory, and his mother is an accountant. He studied in the 12th arrondissement of Paris at the Saint-Michel-de-Picpus Catholic private high school.

Niel started early by developing telecommunication and data services and embarked at a young age on an entrepreneurial career soon after his father gave him a Sinclair ZX81 computer as a Christmas present when he was 15.

In 1987 at 19, while dropping out from school, he successfully created then sold his first company, a Minitel (a French forerunner of the internet) service company. This minitel-site provided sex oriented chat services. To do so, Niel bought press licenses in order to be able to become a service editor, diverting it in order to set up its commercial services. Through this, he became a millionaire in euros at the age of 24.

Career

Telecommunications 
In 1995, he invested in the first Internet Service Provider in France, World-NET, created the previous year by Sébastien Socchard, Philippe Langlois and Pierre Séguret. This company was sold for 30 million euros the year before the internet bubble burst.

Telecommunications with Iliad

After taking over a company subsequently renamed Iliad SA, Xavier Niel launched in 1996 the 1st reversed directory service on the Minitel. This service was responsible for 1 million euros of revenue per year for Iliad until the end of the minitel in France in 2012.
Niel remains Iliad's majority shareholder, holding 71% of the share capital.

In 1999, he created Free, a French Internet service provider. The name came from the fact that modem access was really free, which caused some stir among other (non-free) French Internet providers, as well as it raised some questions about Free's business model. In 2002, Free launched a broadband package at a low price (€29.99 per month), which became the benchmark in the market. At the same time, Free developed and launched the Freebox: the first triple-play multi-service box in France. The free modem service had brought to the company a strong potential customers portfolio, many of them switching to the broadband for the sake of comfort.

In 1999, he founded Online, a French hosting company.

In 2012, he created Free Mobile, which offered unlimited voice calls, text and data at the lowest price of the market in France (€19.99 per month).

The entrepreneur launched the Iliad Italia brand in Italy in 2017, which in April 2021 conquered 9% of the market or 7 million subscribers with mobile offers for less than 10 euros. A launch on fixed connectivity is also planned for 2021.

In 2018, the Iliad SA share price collapsed, going from €212 in January 2018 to €95 in November 2018. After restructuring its assets leading to the creation of the holding HoldCo, Xavier Niel did major maneuvers to reconquer the markets and strengthen its position in the capital of Iliad. In November 2019 he bought back at €120 more than 11.7 million Iliad shares (i.e. 20% of the company's shares) via a public share buyback operation, automatically raising the price to this level. Thanks to this operation financed by a loan guaranteed on Iliad shares held in his holding company Holdco, he increased his control from around 52% to 72%.

In September 2020, through Iliad, he launched a public offer for the Polish operator Play, leader of the Polish mobile market with 15 million subscribers after having bought a 96% stake on the market for 2.2 billion euros.

Telecommunications with NJJ Holding

In 2014, Cable & Wireless Communications (CWC) sold its 55% economic interest in Monaco Telecom to NJJ Capital, an investment vehicle controlled by Xavier Niel for US$445 million.

On 18 December 2014, via its holding company NJJ Capital, he acquired for 2.7 billion dollars (2.8 billion Swiss francs) Orange Switzerland (owned by Apax Partners since 2012), which was renamed Salt Mobile SA in April 2015. In May 2019 Salt Mobile SA sold 90% of its towers for 800 million dollars to Cellnex

In September 2018, he bought 100% of the Cypriot operator MTN Cyprus through Monaco Telecom for 260 million euros, the carrier was rebranded into Epic in June 2019.

In April 2018, through NJJ he personally invested 330 million euros for 32.9% of the capital of Eir. Iliad, for its part, took a 31.6% stake in Eir's capital with a call option to buy back 80% of NJJ's stake in 2024.

In April 2018, via NJJ, he acquired a stake in the capital of Tigo Senegal through the "Teyliom" consortium, a company which was rebranded into Free Senegal in October 2019.

In March 2020, he bought 100% of the operator Vodafone Malta through Monaco Telecom for 250 million euros, market leader for telecommunications operators in Malta, in the fields of mobile, internet and fixed communications. The company was rebranded into Epic on 18 November 2020.

Unibail-Rodamco-Westfield 
In October 2020, through his holding NJJ he buys shares on the stock market of Unibail-Rodamco-Westfield with Leon Bressler and Susana Gallardo, the consortium announced in late October 2020 that their stake in the company exceeds 5%, following their announcement the consortium was able to cancel the company’s plan of capital increase following a shareholders vote in early November 2020, consequently they gained three seats at the company’s board.

On 13 November 2020 the consortium obtained the resignation of Colin Dyer, president of the supervisory board but also its vice president and three other board members, at the end of this meeting Niel’s ally Leon Bressler was elected president of the supervisory Board.

On April, 7th 2021, Niel announced that he owns 15.5% of Unibail-Rodamco-Westfield.

Press 
In late 2010, along with Pierre Bergé and Matthieu Pigasse, Niel acquired a controlling stake in Groupe Le Monde which edits the daily newspaper Le Monde but also magazines such as l’Obs, Courrier International and Télérama.

In February 2020, Niel acquired through his personal holding 100% of Groupe Nice-Matin, which edits the newspapers Nice-Matin, Var-Matin and Monaco-Matin. The group also own an 11% stake in La Provence.

In March 2020, he acquired France-Antilles, a daily newspaper in the French West Indies.

In June 2020, Niel acquired Paris-Turf which is France's first horsing races newspaper.

Other investments 
In March 2010, Xavier Niel cofounded with Jeremie Berrebi Kima Ventures, a fund dedicated to invest in 50 to 100 startups a year everywhere in the world.  Kima Ventures already invested in 330 companies from February 2010 to August 2014 in 32 countries. Business Insider described Xavier Niel and Jeremie Berrebi as almost certainly the most active angel investors in the world. Since 2015, Jean de La Rochebrochard is the Managing Partner of the fund.

In 2013, Niel created a school named 42, which is a free tech school with no teachers, no books, no tuition for 1000 people every year. In 2021, 33 42 campuses have been opened in the world.

In June 2017, Niel welcomed the French President Emmanuel Macron for the inauguration of Station F, a business incubator for startups located in Paris, known as the largest in the world.

In April 2021, he became the first shareholder of the company Unieuro, which is the largest Italian retailer of consumer electronics and household appliances by number of outlets, with a network of 460 stores throughout Italy.

Judiciary problems
On 28 May 2004, Niel was indicted and detained for a month for alleged procuring and misuse of company assets, which occurred in several sex shops in which he was a shareholder. On 30 August 2005, a Nolle prosequi was pronounced for the procuring part of his indictment, while on 13 October 2006, he was given a 2 years suspended prison sentence for the misuse of company assets.

Rewards
In August 2015, Wired named him as the seventh most influential personality in technology in the world.

In February 2017, Vanity Fair named him the most influential French person in the world abroad.

Personal life
Niel's domestic partner is Delphine Arnault, a billionaire in her own right and also the daughter of the richest person in the world, Bernard Arnault. He has a daughter with her and two sons from a previous relationship, and lives in Paris.

Since 2013, he has also owned a five star hotel in French ski resort Courchevel.

In 2016, he acquired a mansion in Paris located in Place des Vosges in The Marais for $35 million.

In 2022, he bought the Parisian palace Hôtel Lambert from a Qatari prince in a $227 million deal. The palace was designed by one of Louis XIV's most beloved architects and a brainchild of Versailles, Louis Le Vau.

References

External links
 

1967 births
Living people
People from Maisons-Alfort
20th-century French businesspeople
21st-century French businesspeople
French billionaires
French chief executives